Frisby is an unincorporated community in Wayne County, Kentucky, United States.

Notes

Unincorporated communities in Wayne County, Kentucky
Unincorporated communities in Kentucky